Gusheh-ye Olya (also Romanized as Gūsheh-ye ‘Olyā; also known as Gūsheh Bālā and Gūsheh-ye Bālā) is a village in Enaj Rural District, Qareh Chay District, Khondab County, Markazi Province, Iran. At the 2006 census, its population was 661, in 152 families.

References 

Populated places in Khondab County